Guillermo Beato Francisco (10 February 1885 – 7 April 1976) was a Filipino military officer who served in the Philippine Constabulary and the Philippine Army. He commanded the 2nd Regular Division (Philippines) during the invasion by Japan, and then survived the Bataan Death March. Paroled from prison, Francisco continued to be a constabulary leader during the Japanese occupation.

Early life and education
Francisco was born and raised in Manila. He attended the Ateneo Municipal and received a bookkeeping diploma from the Liceo de Manila in 1907. Francisco was an honor graduate of the Constabulary School in December 1908.

Military career
In August 1908, Francisco was commissioned as a third lieutenant in the Philippine Constabulary. After training, he served on Luzon until January 1927. Francisco was promoted to major in January 1922 and lieutenant colonel in March 1924.

From January 1927 to early 1936, Francisco served as constabulary commander in the District of Visayas. He was promoted to colonel in November 1927. After the reorganization of the Philippine military, Francisco became a brigadier general in the Philippine Army and served as the first commanding general of the 1st Regular Division from May 1936 to October 1938.

Francisco served as chief of the Philippine Constabulary from 1938 to 1941. After the constabulary was absorbed into the United States Army Forces in the Far East in 1941, he was given command of the 2nd Regular Division. After the Japanese invasion in December, he was promoted to major general. His division fought at Bataan and surrendered along with other United States forces in April 1942.

As a native Filipino, Francisco was imprisoned at the Capas Concentration Camp. Paroled to Manila, he was appointed first assistant director of the Bureau of Constabulary in November 1942 and director in April 1943. Francisco served as director until August 1944, when he was appointed chair of a new advisory board on Public Security.

After the war, Francisco was acquitted of treason charges. He served as technical adviser to Elpidio Quirino from 1946 until his military retirement in 1949.

Later life
After his military retirement, Francisco worked as a real estate developer in Novaliches and Baguio. He died in Manila at age 91.

References

1885 births
1976 deaths
People from Manila
Philippine Constabulary personnel
Filipino generals
Filipino military personnel of World War II
Philippine Army generals of World War II
Filipino prisoners of war
World War II prisoners of war held by Japan
Bataan Death March prisoners